The following highways are numbered 935:

Costa Rica
 National Route 935

Ireland
  R935 regional road

United States